Vagabonds! is a novel written by Nigerian author Eloghosa Osunde. It was published on 15 March 2022 by Riverhead Books. The book explored corruption, LGBTQ in Nigeria, patriarchy.

References 

2022 Nigerian novels
Novels set in Lagos
Riverhead Books books
2020s LGBT novels
Nigerian LGBT novels